Kinich Ahau (Kʼinich Ajaw) is the 16th-century Yucatec name of the Maya sun god, designated as God G when referring to the codices. In the Classic period, God G is depicted as a middle-aged man with an aquiline nose, large square eyes, cross-eyed, and a filed incisor in the upper row of teeth. Usually, there is a k'in ('sun')-infix, sometimes in the very eyes. Among the southern Lacandons, Kinich Ahau continued to play a role in narrative well into the second half of the twentieth century.

Names 
Kinich Ahau is the Yucatec and Lacandon name of the sun god. The element kʼinich, usually assumed to mean 'sun-eyed', appears to have been in general use as a royal title during the Classic Period. Kinich Ahau should not be confused with Ah Kʼin or Ah Kʼin Chob. Ah Kʼin is Yucatec for 'someone who deals with the day(s)', the word for 'day' and 'sun' being the same. The term refers to Yucatec calendar priests and to priests in general. As to Ah Kʼin Chob, J.E.S. Thompson suggested that this Lacandon deity name (alternating with Can Chob and Chi Chac Chob) could refer to the sun deity, but the mythology of Ah Kʼin Chob does not bear this out. Although the element chob has been translated as 'squint-eyed', which is an iconographic feature of the Classic sun deity, the only source for this translation is a single statement by Tozzer.

16th-century Yucatan 
Kinich Ahau was the patron of one of the four years of the 52-year cycle (Landa). In the rituals introducing this year, war dances were executed. Kinich Ahau was apparently considered an aspect of the upper god, Itzamna. He may conceivably be related to the patron deity of Izamal, Kinich Kakmo 'Fire Parrot', who was reported to descend to earth while the sun was standing in the zenith in order to consume offerings (Cogolludo).

Classic period 
God G's appearances in Classic Maya art are, perhaps, best known from large stucco masks adorning pyramids. Compared to the deities connected to agricultural fertility, however, God G occurs rather infrequently in other media than stucco, and is rarely part of narrative events. It may be noted that the Hero Twins, Hunahpu and Xbalanque, although stated to have changed into Sun and Moon, are never shown assimilated to God G.

Land of the Sunrise: Eastern Paradise 
The Sun God is associated with an aquatic eastern paradise, where he can assume the shape of a chimerical water bird, or be shown as a young man, paddling a canoe. Such imagery could suggest lyric religious poetry comparable to the Aztec evocations of a 'flower paradise' (Taube).

Ancestral solar kings 
The sun deity can be shown as a king (ajaw) seated high on a throne cushion (as on the famous, narrative 'Rabbit Vase' from Naranjo), or as a ruler carrying the bicephalic 'ceremonial bar'. Inversely, the Maya king is repeatedly assimilated to the sun deity. The emblematic double-bird of the early Copan king, Yax Kʼukʼ Moʼ 'Great Quetzal-Parrot', shows the head of the sun deity within its beaks. Ancestral Maya kings assimilated to the sun deity were sometimes depicted while vertically descending from the zenith (as on Takalik Abaj stela 2 and Tikal stela 31). Particularly in Yaxchilan, the ancestral king is seated within a solar cartouche, his wife in a lunar crescent. The solar aspect of a king often seems to imply apotheosis and life after death.

Calendar 
Hieroglyphically, the sun god is the patron of the day-unit (kʼin 'day, sun'), the month of Yaxkʼin 'dry season', and the number Four (in parallel with the day Ahau).

Connections with other deities 
Several other deities evince a large eye, such as God D (Itzamna), Chaak(his brother), and various jaguar gods. Attribute sharing (including the kʼin infix) occurs chiefly with the so-called Jaguar God of the Underworld and a human-faced ocean deity with shell ears, fins beside the mouth, and a sacrificial awl set in the mouth. The 'Jaguar God of the Underworld' is traditionally referred to by scholars as the 'Night Sun', i.e., the form supposedly taken by the sun during his subterranean journey from West to East. It has been suggested that the three just-mentioned deities involved in the sharing of attributes could, perhaps, represent various stages of the sun's daily cycle.

Mythology and ritual
Recent Maya mythology is mainly concerned with Sun's childhood and the conflicts leading up to his actual solar transformation. Although specific imagery is used for the path of the sun (for example, the sun being carried through the underworld on the shoulders of its lord), there are hardly any histories concerning the mature sun deity, save for the southern Lacandons. According to them, Kinich Ahau, the elder brother  of the upper god, will put an end to this world by descending from the sky and have his jaguars devour mankind. Little is also known about specific solar rituals, although Kinich Ahau regularly occurs in the Dresden Codex, which is largely concerned with ritual matters.

See also 
 List of solar deities

References

Bibliography 
 Boremanse, Contes et mythologie des indiens lacandons. 1986.
 Hellmuth, Monster und Menschen in der Maya-Kunst. 1987.
 Landa, see Tozzer
 Milbrath, Star Gods of the Maya.
 Stuart and Stuart, Palenque, Eternal City of the Maya. Thames and Hudson 2008.
 Taube, Flower Mountain. Res 45 (2004): 69–98.
 Taube and Miller, The Gods and Symbols of Ancient Mexico and the Maya.
 Thompson, Maya History and Religion. 1970.
 Tozzer, A Comparative Study of the Mayas and the Lacandones. New York 1907.
 Tozzer, Landa's Relación de las Cosas de Yucatán. 1941.

External links 
 

Maya deities
Maya mythology and religion
Solar gods